Farmhouse is the ninth studio album by the American rock band Phish. The album was released on May 16, 2000, by Elektra Records. Farmhouse was the last Phish studio album before their two-year hiatus between October 2000 and December 2002.

The album's first single, "Heavy Things", was one of Phish's most successful radio hits; it was the band's only song to appear on a mainstream pop radio format, reaching #29 on Billboards Adult Top 40 chart that July. The song also became the band's biggest hit to date on the Adult Alternative Songs chart, reaching #2 there. The song had previously been performed for live broadcast during the overnight set of Phish's New Year's Eve 2000 show at Big Cypress (reportedly then the largest concert in the world) as part of ABC's coverage of New Year's festivities around the globe.

Owing in part to the mainstream exposure of "Heavy Things", Farmhouse had the highest-ever first week sales for a Phish record. The album was certified gold by RIAA on January 30, 2006.

Production
Songwriting for Farmhouse was a joint effort between Trey Anastasio and Phish lyricist Tom Marshall, with contributions from Tony Markellis, Russ Lawton and Scott Herman. All of the songs were already part of Phish's live concert song rotation before being recorded for the album, some dating back to 1997. The tracks were recorded at The Barn, frontman Trey Anastasio's studio in Chittenden County, Vermont. The introduction to "Piper" is an extract from the band's live performance of the song on July 18, 1999 at their Camp Oswego Festival in Volney, New York. There is also a Japanese version of the album available as an import which include two bonus studio out-take tracks from the Farmhouse recording sessions which are "Driver" and "Mist" (sometimes referred to as "Mountains in the Mist"). These two songs are currently not available in any format online by Phish although as of December 2018 it can be purchased in its original CD format on Amazon.com and possibly elsewhere for about twice the price of the standard version of the album.

Early incarnations of several tracks from the album can be heard on the 2000 release Trampled by Lambs and Pecked by the Dove, a collection of song sketches and demos recorded by Anastasio and Marshall.

The song "First Tube" was nominated for a Grammy for Best Rock Instrumental Performance.

In February 2009, the album was made available as a download in FLAC and MP3 formats at LivePhish.com.

Critical reception

Farmhouse received mainly positive reviews. Jason Ankeny of AllMusic praised the album as Phish's "rootsiest and most organic effort to date... [and] also their most fully developed – these are complete, concise songs and not simply outlines for extended jams, boasting a beauty and intimacy which expands the group's scope even as it serves notice of a newfound pop accessibility."

Rolling Stones Jon Pareles, however, gave Farmhouse a mediocre rating of only 2.5 stars. The review states that on the album the band walks "a thin line between mellow and torpid" with songs that "are going to need a lot of live (concert) resuscitation".

Track listing

Charting singles
 2000, Heavy Things (No. 22, Adult Top 40)

PersonnelPhishTrey Anastasio – guitars, lead vocals, horn and string arrangements
Page McConnell – keyboards, backing vocals
Mike Gordon – bass guitar, backing vocals
Jon Fishman – drums, backing vocalsAdditional musicians'
Jerry Douglas – dobro on "The Inlaw Josie Wales"
John Dunlop – cello on "Dirt"
Roy Feldman – viola on "Dirt"
Béla Fleck – banjo on "The Inlaw Josie Wales"
Dave Grippo – saxophone on "Gotta Jibboo"
David Gusakov – violin on "Dirt"
Jennifer Hartswick – trumpet on "Gotta Jibboo"
James Harvey – trombone on "Gotta Jibboo"
Laura Markowitz – violin on "Dirt"
Andy Moroz – trombone on "Gotta Jibboo"

References

External links
Phish's official website
 Live at Big Cypress NYE 1999 (ABC TV)

2000 albums
Jammy Award winners
Phish albums
LivePhish.com Downloads
Elektra Records albums
Country rock albums by American artists
Folk rock albums by American artists